La Chapelle-d'Angillon is a commune in the Cher department in the Centre-Val de Loire region of France.

Geography

Population

Personalities
Alain-Fournier (Henri Alban-Fournier), writer, was born here on October 3, 1886.

Sights
 The church, dating from the fifteenth century.
 The chateau of Béthune, with parts dating from the twelfth century.
 A museum, in the chateau, dedicated to Alain-Fournier.

The City in the Art
Realization of a sculpture by French artist from Albens Jean-Louis Berthod, in 2014. The board is a tribute to the book of Alain-Fournier, "Meaulnes the Great", but also to the missing persons of the Great War. Insite the board, we can admirate the "Chateau of La Chapelle-d'Angillon".

See also
Communes of the Cher department

References

External links

Photo of Alain-Fournier’s family home 
Official website of the château 

Communes of Cher (department)